Todd F. Buchwald is an American attorney and legal scholar who served as the United States ambassador-at-Large for global criminal justice from December 30, 2015, until July 2017. He replaced Stephen Rapp.

Education
Buchwald earned a Bachelor of Arts degree from Cornell University and a Juris Doctor from Yale Law School.

Career 
Buchwald is a professorial lecturer in law at the George Washington University Law School. He previously served as a career lawyer in the Office of the Legal Adviser of the Department of State and as an attorney in the Office of White House Counsel. Buchwald was also an associate in the litigation and tax sections of the Washington law firm of Wilmer, Cutler and Pickering.

Publications

 "The Crime of Aggression: the United States Perspective, 109 American Journal of International Law 257 (2015) (with Harold H. Koh)
 "Pre-emption, Iraq and International Law, 97 American Journal of International Law, 557 (2003) (with William H. Taft IV).
 U.S, Security Assistance and Related Programs, in J. N. Moore and R. F. Turner, National Security Law, 2d Edition (Carolina Academic Press 2005) (with Michael J. Matheson).

References

External links
War Crimes Office May Be Closed in State Dept. Reorganization

Cornell University alumni
United States Ambassadors-at-Large for War Crimes Issues
Yale Law School alumni
Wilmer Cutler Pickering Hale and Dorr associates
George Washington University Law School faculty
Living people
Year of birth missing (living people)